{{DISPLAYTITLE:Billboard Music 
Award for Top Female Artist}}

This article lists the winners and nominees for the Billboard Music Award for Top Female Artist. This award has been given since 1990. Taylor Swift is the all-time winner with four and is also the most nominated artist with eight. There are only six  women have won the award more than once: Christina Aguilera, Taylor Swift, Adele, Alicia Keys, Mariah Carey, and Rihanna.

Winners and nominees
Winners are listed first and highlighted in bold.

1990s

2000s

2010s

2020s

Multiple nominations

Multiple wins

References

Erin

Billboard awards